Feng Keng (7 October 1907 – 10 February 1931) was a poet and author who, following her execution became known as one of the Five Martyrs of the League of Left-Wing Writers. Feng was born in Guangdong province, China. Her mother was a teacher.

When the magazine China Forum reported on the executions, it also published poems and stories written by four of those killed, Feng's work was featured.

References

Bibliography

 

 
 
 

1907 births
1931 deaths
Executed writers
People executed by the Republic of China
Executed people from Guangdong